The 2021–22 Lamar Lady Cardinals basketball team represented Lamar University during the 2021–22 NCAA Division I women's basketball season. The Lady Cardinals, led by third year head coach Aqua Franklin, played their home games at the Montagne Center in Beaumont, Texas as members of the Western Athletic Conference.

This season was the Lady Cardinals' first and only as members of the Western Athletic Conference. Lamar was one of four schools, all from Texas, that left the Southland Conference in July 2021 to join the WAC.  The Lady Cardinals finished the 2021–22 season with an overall record of 14–15 and 8–10 in conference play. The seventh seeded Lady Cardinals won their WAC tournament opening round game against tenth seed New Mexico State 65-54.  Their season ended with a first round tournament loss to sixth seed Sam Houston.

Previous season
The Lady Cardinals finished the 2020–21 season with an overall record of 10–14 and 9–6 in conference play. Their season ended losing to Central Arkansas in a quarter-final game in the Southland Conference tournament.  Lamar entered the tournament as fourth seed.

Offseason

Incoming transfers

Source:

Roster

Schedule
Sources:

|-
!colspan=12 style=| Exhibition

|-
!colspan=12 style=| Non-Conference season

|-
!colspan=12 style=| WAC Conference season

|-
!colspan=9 style=|WAC Tournament

Source:

See also 
2021–22 Lamar Cardinals basketball team

References 

Lamar Lady Cardinals basketball seasons
Lamar
Lamar Lady Cardinals basketball
Lamar Lady Cardinals basketball